The 86th Carnatic Infantry was an infantry regiment originally raised in 1794 as the 36th Madras Native Infantry, part of the Presidency of Madras Army which was itself part of the Honourable East India Company Army.  The presidency armies, like the presidencies themselves, belonged to the East India Company until the Government of India Act 1858 (passed in the aftermath of the Indian Rebellion of 1857) transferred all three presidencies to the direct authority of the British Crown.  In 1903 all three presidency armies were merged into the British Indian Army. The unit was disbanded before Indian Independence.

History
Their first action was in the Battle of Nagpore in the Fourth Anglo-Mysore War; then the Battle of Kemendine in the First Burmese War. They returned to Burma in 1885, in the Second Burmese War.

During World War I they were attached to the 9th (Secunderabad) Division which remained in India, on internal security and training duties.

After World War I the Indian government reformed the army moving from single battalion regiments to multi battalion regiments. In 1922, the 86th Carnatic Infantry became the 10th (Training) Battalion, 3rd Madras Regiment. The regiment was later disbanded for economic reasons.

Predecessor names
 36th Madras Native Infantry - 1794
 2nd Battalion, 13th Madras Native Infantry - 1798
 26th Madras Native Infantry - 1824
 26th Madras Infantry - 1885
 86th Carnatic Infantry - 1903

References

 
 
 
 
 

British Indian Army infantry regiments
Honourable East India Company regiments
1794 in India
Military history of the Madras Presidency
Military units and formations established in 1794
Military units and formations disestablished in 1922
1794 establishments in British India